Daniel Rosenzweig Ávila (December 28, 1984 in Rio de Janeiro) is a Brazilian actor.

Biography 

He began his career as a child, at 6 years of age to be chosen in a test among more than a hundred children, to play the role of Azelino (Zezinho), son of Zé Trovão, in the novel A História de Ana Raio e Zé Trovão of extinct TV Manchete. Since then has not stopped: We work in telenovelas, series, mini-series, educational videos, Theatre and Cinema. The actor is also a voice actor since the age of 9. He graduated in cinema, with postgraduate studies in Cuba.

Personal life 

The actor was married to actress Karla Tenório with whom she has a daughter, Flor. The marriage with Karla lasted from 2007 to 2016, and with whom he worked with in novels Agora É que São Elas on Rede Globo and Amigas e Rivais in SBT.

Filmography

Television

Film

Theater

References

External links 

1984 births
Living people
Male actors from Rio de Janeiro (city)
Brazilian male television actors
Brazilian male telenovela actors
Brazilian male film actors
Brazilian male stage actors